The 2006 Connecticut Huskies football team represented the University of Connecticut in the 2006 NCAA Division I FBS football season as a member of the Big East Conference. The team was coached by Randy Edsall and played its home games at Rentschler Field in East Hartford, Connecticut.

Schedule

References

Connecticut
UConn Huskies football seasons
Connecticut Huskies football